Frank Collins (5 November 1956 – 16 June 1998) was a Church of England clergyman and the first 22 SAS soldier to enter the building in the Iranian Embassy Siege in 1980. Whilst with 22 SAS B Squadron (Air) Troop, Collins served with both Al Slater and Charles "Nish" Bruce. He left the service in 1989 to work in security and later pursued training for ordained ministry.

Having trained at Oak Hill College, a conservative evangelical theological college, Collins was ordained in the Church of England as a deacon in 1992 and as a priest in 1993. He served his curacy at St Peter with St Owen and St James, Hereford in the Diocese of Hereford. He was then commissioned as a chaplain in the Territorial Army, and served as padre of 23 Special Air Service Regiment (Reserve), The Parachute Regiment and the AMF(L) in Bulford, Wiltshire.

His autobiography, Baptism of Fire, was published by Doubleday in 1997. He committed suicide by gassing himself in his car in 1998.

References

1998 deaths
Special Air Service soldiers
Royal Army Chaplains' Department officers
Suicides by gas
20th-century English Anglican priests
1956 births
British Parachute Regiment officers
Suicides in England
British military personnel who committed suicide
1998 suicides
Evangelical Anglican clergy
Alumni of Oak Hill College
Military personnel from Newcastle upon Tyne